The 2023 WTA Lyon Open (also known as the Open 6ème Sens — Métropole de Lyon for sponsorship reasons) was a women's tennis tournament played on indoor hard courts. It was the fourth edition of the Lyon Open (WTA) and an International tournament on the 2023 WTA Tour. It took place at the Palais des Sports de Gerland in Lyon, France, from January 30 to February 5, 2023.

Champions

Singles 

  Alycia Parks def.  Caroline Garcia, 7–6(9–7), 7–5

Doubles 

  Cristina Bucșa /  Bibiane Schoofs def.  Olga Danilović /  Alexandra Panova, 7–6(7–5), 6–3

Singles main draw entrants

Seeds 

1 Rankings as of 16 January 2023.

Other entrants 
The following players received wildcards into the singles main draw: 
  Clara Burel
  Kristina Mladenovic
  Garbiñe Muguruza

The following players received entry from the qualifying draw:
  Erika Andreeva
  Marina Bassols Ribera 
  Olga Danilović
  Ana Konjuh
  Rebeka Masarova
  Linda Nosková

Withdrawals 
  Sorana Cîrstea → replaced by  Alycia Parks
  Anhelina Kalinina → replaced by  Camila Osorio
  Liudmila Samsonova → replaced by  Viktorija Golubic
  Jil Teichmann → replaced by  Tamara Korpatsch
  Martina Trevisan → replaced by  Maryna Zanevska
  Donna Vekić → replaced by  Julia Grabher

Retirements 
  Anna Blinkova (right forearm injury)

Doubles main draw entrants

Seeds 

 Rankings as of January 16, 2023.

Other entrants 
The following pairs received wildcards into the doubles main draw:
  Madison Brengle /  Amandine Hesse
  Alena Fomina-Klotz /  Elsa Jacquemot

Withdrawals 
 Before the tournament
  Anastasia Dețiuc /  Oksana Kalashnikova → replaced by  Anastasia Dețiuc /  Jesika Malečková
  Miriam Kolodziejová /  Viktória Kužmová → replaced by  Jessika Ponchet /  Renata Voráčová
 During the tournament
  Alicia Barnett /  Natela Dzalamidze (illness)
  Anna Blinkova /  Ulrikke Eikeri (right forearm injury)

References

External links 
 Official website

2023 in French tennis
2023 WTA Tour
2023 WTA Lyon Open
2023
January 2023 sports events in France
February 2023 sports events in France